Liam Honohan (born 17 April 1969) is an Irish retired Gaelic footballer. His league and championship career with the Cork senior team lasted from 1992 until 1999.

Honohan made his debut on the inter-county scene at the age of seventeen when he was selected for the Cork minor team. He enjoyed one championship season with the minor team, however, he was an All-Ireland runner-up. Honohan subsequently joined the Cork under-21 team, winning an All-Ireland medal in 1989. After winning an All-Ireland medal with the Cork junior team, he made his senior debut during the 1992-93 league. An All-Ireland runner-up in his debut season, Honohan won three Munster medals and a National League medal.

Honours

Cork
 Munster Senior Football Championship (3): 1993, 1994, 1995
National Football League (1): 1998-99
 All-Ireland Junior Football Championship (1): 1990
 Munster Junior Football Championship (1): 1990
 All-Ireland Under-21 Football Championship (1): 1989
 Munster Under-21 Football Championship (1): 1989
 Munster Minor Football Championship (1): 1987

References

1969 births
Living people
Bishopstown Gaelic footballers
Cork inter-county Gaelic footballers